Events in the year 1989 in Japan. In the history of Japan, it marks the final year of the Shōwa period, Shōwa 64, upon the death of Emperor Shōwa on January 7, and the beginning of the Heisei period, Heisei 1 (平成元年 Heisei gannen, gannen means "first year"), from January 8 under the reign of his son the current emperor emeritus. Thus, 1989 corresponds to the transition between Shōwa and Heisei In the Japanese calendar.

1989 was the first year of Heisei in Japan as well as the all-time peak of the Nikkei 225 stock market average.

Incumbents
Emperor:
Shōwa until January 7
Akihito from January 7
Prime Minister:
Noboru Takeshita (L–Shimane) until June 3
Sōsuke Uno (L–Shiga) from June 3 until August 10
Toshiki Kaifu (L–Aichi) from August 10
Chief Cabinet Secretary: Keizo Obuchi (L–Gunma) until June 3, Tokuo Yamashita (L–Saga) until August 25, Mayumi Moriyama (Councillor, L–Tochigi)
 Chief Justice of the Supreme Court: Kōichi Yaguchi
 President of the House of Representatives: Kenzaburō Hara (L–Hyōgo) until June 2, Hajime Tamura (L–Mie)
 President of the House of Councillors: Yoshihiko Tsuchiya (L–Saitama) until July 9 and again from August 7
 Diet sessions: 114th (regular session opened in December 1988, to June 22), 115th (extraordinary, August 7 to August 12), 116th (extraordinary, September 28 to December 16), 117th (regular, December 25 to 1990, January 24)

Governors
Aichi Prefecture: Reiji Suzuki 
Akita Prefecture: Kikuji Sasaki 
Aomori Prefecture: Masaya Kitamura 
Chiba Prefecture: Takeshi Numata 
Ehime Prefecture: Sadayuki Iga 
Fukui Prefecture: Yukio Kurita
Fukuoka Prefecture: Hachiji Okuda 
Fukushima Prefecture: Eisaku Satō
Gifu Prefecture: Yosuke Uematsu (until 5 February); Taku Kajiwara (starting 6 February)
Gunma Prefecture: Ichiro Shimizu 
Hiroshima Prefecture: Toranosuke Takeshita 
Hokkaido: Takahiro Yokomichi 
Hyogo Prefecture: Toshitami Kaihara 
Ibaraki Prefecture: Fujio Takeuchi 
Ishikawa Prefecture: Yōichi Nakanishi 
Iwate Prefecture:   
Kagawa Prefecture: Jōichi Hirai 
Kagoshima Prefecture: Kaname Kamada (until 27 February); Yoshiteru Tsuchiya (starting 27 February)
Kanagawa Prefecture: Kazuji Nagasu 
Kochi Prefecture: Chikara Nakauchi  
Kumamoto Prefecture: Morihiro Hosokawa 
Kyoto Prefecture: Teiichi Aramaki 
Mie Prefecture: Ryōzō Tagawa 
Miyagi Prefecture: Sōichirō Yamamoto (until 28 March); Shuntarō Honma (starting 28 March)
Miyazaki Prefecture: Suketaka Matsukata 
Nagano Prefecture: Gorō Yoshimura 
Nagasaki Prefecture: Isamu Takada 
Nara Prefecture: Shigekiyo Ueda 
Niigata Prefecture: Takeo Kimi (until 13 April); Kiyoshi Kaneko (starting 4 June)
Oita Prefecture: Morihiko Hiramatsu 
Okayama Prefecture: Shiro Nagano 
Okinawa Prefecture: Junji Nishime 
Osaka Prefecture: Sakae Kishi
Saga Prefecture: Kumao Katsuki 
Saitama Prefecture: Yawara Hata 
Shiga Prefecture: Minoru Inaba 
Shiname Prefecture: Nobuyoshi Sumita 
Shizuoka Prefecture: Shigeyoshi Saitō 
Tochigi Prefecture: Fumio Watanabe
Tokushima Prefecture: Shinzo Miki 
Tokyo: Shun'ichi Suzuki 
Tottori Prefecture: Yuji Nishio 
Toyama Prefecture: Yutaka Nakaoki
Wakayama Prefecture: Shirō Kariya  
Yamagata Prefecture: Seiichirō Itagaki 
Yamaguchi Prefecture: Toru Hirai 
Yamanashi Prefecture: Kōmei Mochizuki

Events

January 
 January 7: Emperor Hirohito dies; Prince Akihito becomes Emperor.
 January 8: Heisei era officially begins.

February 
 February 7: Last public performance by singer Misora Hibari held in Kitakyushu.
 February 13: The Recruit scandal breaks, and the company's former president is arrested.
 February 24: State funeral of Emperor Hirohito.

April 
 April 1 
 Japan introduces its first national consumption tax of three percent.
Sendai becomes a city designated by government ordinance.
 April 25: Noboru Takeshita resigns as Prime Minister following a stock-trading scandal.
 April 26: The Dragon Ball Z anime series starts on Fuji TV.

June 
 June 1: 100th anniversary of the foundation of Fukuoka City.
 June 2: Takeshita cabinet resigns, Sōsuke Uno becomes Prime Minister.

July 
 July 1: 100th anniversary of the foundations of Kōfu and Gifu City.
 July 12: 100th anniversary of the foundation of Akita City.
 July 16: A large-scale landslides occurred, following to a microbus crushed by rockfall prevention in Echizen, Fukui Prefecture, according to official confirmed report, 15 people fatalities. 
 July 23 
 In the 15th regular election for the House of Councillors, Liberal Democrats lose their majority for the first time in party history. In the ensuing "twisted Diet" (nejire kokkai), it must cooperate with the Socialist-led opposition as it does not hold a two-thirds majority in the House of Representatives. The Uno cabinet resigns.

August 
 August 8: Reformist Toshiki Kaifu from the small Kōmoto faction is elected LDP president with 279 votes against Yoshirō Hayashi (Nikaidō group, a breakaway group from the Takeshita faction, 120 votes) and Shintarō Ishihara (formerly with his own faction that merged into the Abe faction in 1984, 48 votes)
 August 9: First Kaifu cabinet formed and formally appointed one day later.

September 
 September 27: Yokohama Bay Bridge opens.

October 
 October 1: 100th anniversary of the foundations of Nagoya City, Tottori City and Tokushima City.
 October 8: Eight climbers died of hypothermia on Mount Tate, Toyama Prefecture.

November 
 November 4: Sakamoto family murder - Aum Shinrikyo murders a lawyer, Tsutsumi Sakamoto, as well as his wife, Satoko, and infant son, Tatsuhiko, who had been working on a lawsuit against the religious group.
 November 22: The Japan Trade Union Confederation, or "RENGO", is founded with the merger of the Japan Confederation of Labor (Dōmei) and the Federation of Independent Labor Unions (Chūritsu Rōren).

December 
 December 15: 100th anniversary of the foundation of Matsuyama City.
 December 29: The Nikkei 225 index of the Tokyo Stock Exchange reaches its all-time record high of 38,915.87.

Births
 January 3 – Kōhei Uchimura, gymnast
 January 25 – Mikako Tabe, stage and film actress
 February 2 – Shuhei Fukuda, professional baseball player
 February 25: Kana Hanazawa, actress and singer
 March 17 – Shinji Kagawa, football player
 March 18 – Kana Nishino, singer-songwriter
 March 23 – Natsuna Watanabe, actress and model
 April 8 – Hitomi Takahashi, singer
 April 11 – Yoshihiro Maru, professional baseball player
 May 30
Yui Ishikawa, actress and voice actress
Akiyo Noguchi, professional rock climber
 June 5 – Megumi Nakajima, voice actress and singer
 June 7 – Seiji Kobayashi, professional baseball player
 June 23 – Ayana Taketatsu, voice actress and singer
 July 9 – Kiyono Yasuno, voice actress and singer
 July 13 – Sayumi Michishige, singer
 September 7 – Daiki Yamashita, voice actor
 September 17 – Yuhei Nakaushiro, former professional baseball player
 September 29 – Makoto Furukawa, voice actor
 October 11 – Tomoyuki Sugano, professional baseball pitcher 
 October 21 – May'n, singer
 November 11
 Reina Tanaka, singer
 Chiaki Omigawa, voice actress and actress
 November 23 – Shinya Kayama, professional baseball player
 December 27 – Maaya Uchida, actress, voice actress and singer
 December 29 – Kei Nishikori, tennis player

Deaths
 January 4 – Junko Furuta, murder victim (b. 1971)
 January 7 – Emperor Shōwa (b. 1901)
 January 31 – Yasushi Akutagawa,  composer and conductor (b. 1925)
 February 9 – Osamu Tezuka, manga artist (b. 1928)
 April 27 – Konosuke Matsushita, founder of Matsushita Electric (b. 1894)
 May 15
Noriko Tsukase, voice actress (b. 1945)
Yae Ibuka, nurse (b. 1897)
 June 2 – Takeo Watanabe, musician and composer (b. 1933)
 June 24 – Hibari Misora, singer and actress (b. 1937)
 August 15 – Minoru Genda, military aviator and politician (b. 1904)
 August 18 – Yuji Koseki, composer (b. 1909)
 October 26 – Kumeko Urabe, film actor (b. 1902).
 November 6 – Yūsaku Matsuda, actor (b. 1949)
 December 12 – Suiho Tagawa, manga artist (b. 1899)
 December 30 – Yasuji Miyazaki, Olympic swimmer (b. 1916)

Statistics
Yen value: US$1 = ¥127 (low) to ¥144 (high)

See also
 1989 in Japanese television
 List of Japanese films of 1989

References

External links
Anatomy of Gray, Google Books

 
Years of the 20th century in Japan
Japan